is a character in Resident Evil (Biohazard in Japan), a survival horror video game series created by Japanese company Capcom. Ethan was introduced as one of the playable characters in the 2017 video game Resident Evil 7: Biohazard, in which he is depicted as an ordinary civilian searching for his missing wife within a dilapidated estate in Louisiana. He is also the protagonist of the 2021 sequel Resident Evil Village, where he is forced to locate his kidnapped daughter in a mysterious European village. 

Originally designed as an unseen everyman to foster the player's identification with him as the protagonist of Resident Evil 7, Capcom intended to shape Ethan from a blank state into a more defined character in Village. He is voiced by Hidenobu Kiuchi in Japanese and Todd Soley in English. Ethan has received a mixed reception from video game publications, with some praising his relatability, while others have criticized him for a lack of emotional range and character development.

Conception and creation

In Resident Evil 7: Biohazard, players take Ethan's viewpoint as an embodied presence as opposed to an on-screen avatar. The game's goal for players is to advance the narrative while keeping him alive with limited resources. According to Morimasa Sato, who was a writer for Resident Evil 7 and the director of the  Resident Evil Village, the development team initially thought of Ethan as merely "a camera for the player" and "transparent". 

Towards the end of development for Resident Evil 7: Biohazard, its developers had begun planning for the next mainline Resident Evil game. A decision was made by the developers to set it as a direct continuation of Resident Evil 7 and Ethan's story arc, as they had developed an attachment to Ethan and saw potential in him as a character. Producer Peter Fabiano stated that the team wanted players to experience Village from Ethan's perspective, with Sato describing Village as the story of Ethan and "the entirety of who he is". 

Ethan's face is never shown within the gameplay for Resident Evil 7 or Resident Evil Village due to players controlling Ethan from a first-person perspective. An unused version of Ethan's character model, hidden within the game's assets, has fully developed facial features. In the expansion "Shadows of Rose" for Resident Evil Village, Ethan appears in a third-person mode and despite attempts to obscure his face, players could see it by performing certain actions.

Portrayal 
In Resident Evil 7: Biohazard and Resident Evil Village, Ethan was voiced by American actor, Todd Soley. In Japanese, he was voiced by Hidenobu Kiuchi. The character model was based by the Tunisian model, Yaya Chamki.

Appearances

Resident Evil 7: Biohazard
Ethan made his first appearance in the 2017 video game Resident Evil 7: Biohazard. He is an American systems engineer who worked in Los Angeles. Nearly three years after his wife Mia's disappearance, Ethan receives a cryptic video message from Mia that leads him to a derelict plantation in a small Louisiana town called Dulvey. He locates and rescues Mia, but she abruptly becomes hostile and attacks Ethan while attempting to flee, dismembering his hand with a chainsaw. Ethan attacks her in self defense, landing a seemingly fatal blow on her before encountering Jack Baker, who incapacitates and abducts him. Ethan wakes up to a dinner event where several members of the Baker family gather, but manages to escape his captors and receives assistance from Zoe Baker, a wayward member of the Baker family who had reattached Ethan's hand when he was still unconscious. She reveals that her family is under the control of Eveline, a powerful genetically engineered bio-weapon. Zoe reveals that Eveline can infect other humans, which grants them powerful regenerative abilities and super-human strength. Zoe advises Ethan to synthesize a serum from components across the plantation that can cure Mia and herself.

Ethan's journey leads him to battle other members of the Baker family and the Molded, humanoid monstrosities created by Eveline. He ultimately cures Mia who successfully regains control of herself. Mia reveals she was employed by a criminal syndicate to act as Eveline's handler but succumbed to her influence. Ethan confronts Eveline and dispatches her with the assistance of a paramilitary company led by Chris Redfield. Ethan and Mia escape the plantation. 

The amount of blood and gore players as Ethan are exposed to in the Japanese version of the game, Biohazard 7: Resident Evil, is substantially less compared to the international release. On the other hand, smaller changes made to Ethan's dismemberment, such as black blood flowing from his severed limbs, alludes to an important plot point which suggests that he may have been infected with the mold generated by Eveline.

Resident Evil Village
Ethan returns in Resident Evil Village as its central character. Set three years after the events of the previous game, Ethan lives in Europe with Mia and their newborn daughter, Rosemary. Chris Redfield storms the house and kills Mia while taking him and Rosemary under custody. The truck transporting Ethan is attacked and he is stranded in a nearby village whose inhabitants are massacred by lycans. He is captured by Karl Heisenberg, one of the four local lords who serve the village's leader, Mother Miranda, and brought before her, discovering that they have Rosemary. Miranda allows Heisenberg to dispose of Ethan, but Ethan escapes.

After defeating Alcina Dimitrescu, one of the lords, Ethan discovers that Rosemary was dismembered, her remains stored in four flasks, each of the lords in possession of one of them; he learns from the local merchant The Duke that she can be revived should he retrieve all flasks. After obtaining them, and killing all the lords except for Heisenberg, Ethan reunites with Chris who reveals that the "Mia" he killed was a shapeshifting Miranda posing as her to kidnap Rosemary, and he was trying to protect the family. Using a makeshift tank assembled by Chris, Ethan kills Heisenberg, only to be fatally wounded by Miranda as she rips out his heart. However, Ethan survives due to the regenerative abilities he developed through the effects of the strain of mold from Louisiana.

Shortly after, Ethan begins to hallucinate. Eveline appears to Ethan, taunting Ethan that he has been dead since Louisiana, having been killed by Jack Baker in their first encounter. Ethan comes back to reality, being transported by The Duke in his carriage. Ethan confronts Miranda and defeats her, rescuing the restored Rosemary, but begins to succumb to his wounds, which prove to be too severe for his regenerative abilities to counter. Having planted a bomb to destroy the Megamycete (the source of the mold that birthed Miranda, the Four Lords, and Eveline) Chris attempts to help Ethan and Rosemary to his helicopter. However, Ethan realizes he is dying, and entrusts his daughter to Chris and asks him to watch over her. Ethan then takes the detonator from Chris as Miranda's mold spreads, separating Ethan and Chris. Ethan limps toward the Megamycete and detonates the bomb, sacrificing himself as it destroys the village while the helicopter containing Chris, Mia, and Rose flies away.

In the Shadows of Rose DLC chapter, set sixteen years after the game's main events, Rose enters the Megamycete's realm to find a way to remove her powers through a remnant Hound Wolf Squad have recently acquired. Shortly after entering, an entity calling itself "Michael" makes contact with her, only communicating through writing. He provides Rose resources and enhancements to her abilities, though suggests she leave on multiple occasions. Rose eventually learns of that "Michael" is actually Ethan after he is forced to physically interfere to save her from Eveline. Files reveal that his consciousness survived through the Megamycete, which he was in close proximity with before his death. After learning the cure is actually a trap set by the remnant of Miranda, Ethan tries to help Rose escape but is critically injured. Rather than leave him to die, Rose enhances herself and battles Miranda, killing her after being further empowered by him. As she leaves the realm, Ethan expresses how proud of her he is, giving her his wedding ring as she returns to the real world.

Promotion and merchandise
To promote Village, Capcom released a developer diary titled “The Making of Resident Evil Village: Winter Comes for Ethan” in September 2020, where staff members discuss Ethan's role within the game.  

The Resident Evil Village Deluxe Edition is bundled with an art book titled "The Tragedy of Ethan Winters".

Reception
Ethan has received a mixed reception. Some video game journalists, such as Chris Moyse from Destructoid and Liana Ruppert from Game Informer, credit the character's role in Resident Evil 7 as a factor behind the video game's popularity and ongoing commercial success. Josh West from GamesRadar+ suggested that Ethan's return to headline a direct sequel to Resident Evil 7 is unprecedented and noted that Capcom had never entrusted a single protagonist with back-to-back installments of the mainline Resident Evil series.

Some commentators have positively reviewed Ethan as a relatable protagonist. Ray Porreca thought that the "murky" environments of Resident Evil 7 conflicted with Ethan's slightly formal attire, delineating him as "what a modern hero can look like". Porreca noted Ethan is at odds of what constitutes a conventional Resident Evil protagonist, and felt an unskilled everyman who survives against overwhelming odds, subverting player's expectations of "a game [Resident Evil 7] that upsets tradition to restore some glory to its name". The Escapists Audric Figueroa agreed that Ethan is very different compared to previous Resident Evil protagonists, who are portrayed as heroic law enforcement agents fighting against corporations, as he is motivated by his personal relationship with Mia. Figueroa suggested that a mundane family man who is eager to rescue his wife is the "perfect protagonist" for the story, where domestic violence both "literal and metaphorical" forms the core of the game's "encounter philosophy".

Others have criticized Ethan for lacking in personality or character development.  Game Informers Andrew Reiner described Ethan's personality to be "as transparent as the specters he encounters". He noted an incongruency between the character's occasional reactions to inconsequential details but mostly silent nature in the face of danger, and thought that its narrative unravels into a "voyeuristic" exploration of the estate's inhabitants instead of its protagonist's personal stake in it. Hannes Rossow from German publication GamePro was highly critical of the character's perceived lack of personality in Resident Evil 7. He wrote that Ethan's prominence in Village had dampened his enthusiasm for the game and expressed a preference for another protagonist who is a properly developed character. Chandler Wood of PlayStation LifeStyle called Ethan Resident Evils most forgettable character for his lack of emotion, leading to real-world instances where people could not recall his name and felt that the player was unable to both simultaneously control and emphasize with him. Matthew Bryd of Den of Geek felt Ethan was the worst protagonist of a Resident Evil title and even gaming in general, citing "bad voice acting, bad writing, and questionable lore", as well as further character flaws. Giovanni Colantonio of Inverse described Ethan as the worst game hero of all time. He further said that "Ethan feels like the dumbest, most hapless man in the world, and yet nothing can hurt him." Gene Park of The Washington Post called Ethan an "idiot" for how he reacted to events during Resident Evil Village. He criticized that Ethan "has no character arc" and "isn't likely to enter the pantheon of great video game characters." Ashley Bardhan from Kotaku has also criticized and compared Ethan to James Sunderland from Silent Hill, stating that both characters are "the same" and "boring". Conversely, Andy Kelly from PC Gamer and Jade King from TheGamer opined that being "boring" or "generic" is Ethan's most positive contribution to the player's gameplay experience, given the context of the dangerous environments and characters he faces. 
Ian Walker from Kotaku was amused by Capcom's persistent attempts to hide Ethan's face behind the weapons he wields within promotional art, while GamePros Hannes Rossow called the attempts to maintain the illusion of Ethan as a faceless character absurd, as the character's actual face is known to exist within the game assets of Resident Evil 7. Moises Taveras of Paste wrote he didn't feel that Ethan belonged in the world, due to his ambiguous backstory and lack of physical appearance. As a result of his faceless presentation and lack of background information provided by Capcom, Ethan's character is often discussed in fan theories about his true nature. In addition, Epic Games included Ethan, along with Jill Valentine and Lady Dimitrescu, in a list of characters and brands as part of a 2021 survey it distributed to Fortnite players in order to gauge interest in future crossover promotions. 

Some critics have noted a tendency throughout the games for Ethan to suffer from serious injury or complete dismemberment of his limbs, particularly his hands, and an ability to quickly heal or re-attach them with little effort.

Analysis
In her discussion of allusions between Resident Evil 7  and horror cinema as part of the former's use of intertextuality, Dawn Stobbart described multiple instances where Ethan's journey mirror that of specific scenes from the 1974 film The Texas Chain Saw Massacre. Ethan's predicament during the dinner table scene with the Baker family is analyzed as the most overt example: like recurring franchise character Sally Hardesty, Ethan is seated at the foot of the table as he awakens to a grotesque feast seemingly made from human entrails, while the other characters present almost identically mirror the characters Sally encounters at the table.

References

Bibliography 

Amputee characters in video games
Capcom protagonists
Fictional American diaspora
Fictional American people in video games
Fictional characters from Los Angeles
Fictional characters with disfigurements
Fictional engineers
Fictional suicides
Fictional vampire hunters
Fictional zombie hunters
Male characters in video games
Mutant characters in video games
Resident Evil characters
Undead characters in video games
Video game characters introduced in 2017
Video game characters with accelerated healing